Dornelas may refer to:

Portugal
 Dornelas (Aguiar da Beira), a civil parish in the municipality of Aguiar da Beira
 Dornelas (Amares), a civil parish in the municipality of Amares
 Dornelas (Boticas), a civil parish in the municipality of Boticas
 Dornelas (Sever do Vouga), a civil parish in the municipality of Sever do Vouga

Parish name disambiguation pages